The Bad Kids is a 2020 Chinese streaming television series that premiered on iQiyi on June 16, 2020, which tells a story of the web of consequences birthed among different families after three children accidentally film a murder. It is directed by Xin Shuang, and features an ensemble cast that includes Qin Hao, Wang Jingchun, Zhang Songwen, Liu Lin and Lu Fangsheng, with special starring by Rong Zishan, Shi Pengyuan and Wang Shengdi.

The series was adapted from Zijin Chen's 2014 novel, Bad Kid. It is the second drama as part of iQiyi's Light On Theater, after Kidnapping Game.

Plot
Fifteen-year-old Zhu Chaoyang is a young boy who excels academically, but he is detested by others for his cold demeanor. His parents are divorced and he is generally left to fend for himself. His mother, Zhou Chunhong, is often gone for work at a resort. He has a poor relationship with his father, Zhu Yongping, his step-mother, Wang Yao, and his half-sister, Zhu Jingjing.

Chaoyang is approached by Yan Liang, his former primary school acquaintance. Liang introduces Chaoyang to a younger girl named Yue Pu (nicknamed Pupu). The two escaped from a welfare house. Liang's father was a criminal and former drug addict who now lives in a mental hospital. Pupu is an orphan who needs 300,000 yuan to treat her younger brother's leukemia. Chaoyang agrees to let them stay in his apartment while his mother is at work.

Chen Guansheng is a police officer about to retire. He arrested Liang's father years ago and, as a result, he feels a bit of responsibility for Liang. Guansheng is on the trail of Liang and Pupu, but consistently one step behind.

Zhang Dongsheng is a teacher whose wife, Xu Jing, wants a divorce. He takes his in-laws to Mount Liufeng and asks them to help him fix his marriage, but they refuse. Enraged, Dongsheng pushes them off a cliff to their deaths. The three kids accidentally record this crime while visiting the mountain to take pictures. The trio decide to trade the footage with Dongsheng in exchange for 300,000 yuan. Dongsheng says he doesn't have the money but offers them 30,000 yuan upfront with payments to come later.

Jingjing falls to her death from the fifth floor when Pupu and Chaoyang are present. However, Chaoyang claims to have not witnessed the event out of fear of being blamed. Wang Yao's gangster brother, Wang Li, learns of Jingjing's death. He kidnaps Chaoyang and tries to torture a confession out of the boy. Dongsheng tries to steel Wang Li's car keys to retrieve the 30,000 yuan he gave the children. However, he is caught by Wang Li and so Dongshang stabs him to death. Chaoyang is found by Yongping and Wang Yao, who take him to the hospital.

Pupu eventually begins to trust Dongsheng after he saved Chaoyang and let her and Liang stay at his apartment during a typhoon. Dongsheng gives the kids 300,000 yuan he borrows from a loan shark but overhears Liang telling Chaoyang that he will keep backup footage of the murders. Dongsheng forces Liang to give him the backup but finds that it is fake. As a result, he hesitates to save Pupu during an asthma attack and puts her in danger of dying of asphyxiation.

Wang Yao and Yongping return to the factory to look for Wang Li but are attacked and murdered by Dongsheng. Chaoyang and Liang also arrive at the factory to search for Pupu, but fail to find her. Dongsheng burns down the building and escapes. Chaoyang and Liang decide to finally report Dongsheng.

The boys arrange a meeting with Dongsheng on an old ship. Liang sends a letter to Guansheng about Dongsheng's crimes and the 300,000 yuan to save Pupu's brother. The two boys confront Dongsheng, and he tells Chaoyang to stab him. Chaoyang hesitates and stabs Dongsheng in the shoulder but not in the heart. Dongsheng reveals Pupu is alive and safe in the hospital. As Dongsheng moves to stab Chaoyang to death, he is shot to death by the police. Chaoyang returns to life as normal with his mother. Guansheng pays for Pupu's brother's medical treatment. Liang aspires to become a police officer. At Pupu's behest, Chaoyang tells the police of the true cause of Jingjing's death.

Cast 

 Qin Hao as Zhang Dongsheng
 Wang Jingchun as Chen Guansheng
 Rong Zishan as Zhu Chaoyang
 Shi Pengyuan as Yan Liang
 Wang Shengdi as Yue Pu
 Zhang Songwen as Zhu Yongping
 Liu Lin as Zhou Chunhong
 Lu Fangsheng as Ye Jun
 Li Meng as Wang Yao
 Huang Miyi as Xu Jing
 Li Junting as Wang Li
 Mu Liyan as Mrs. Chen
 Lin Peng as Ma Guangcai
 Chen Duoyi as Zhu Jingjing
 Ren Luomin as Xu Guangshen

 Liu Chenxia as Bi Shuxian
 Ning Li as Zhang Jinglin
 Wang Yidan as Teacher Wang
 Li Zhouwu as Le Le
 Liu Jingjing as Sister Li
 Wu Meixia as Sister Liu
 Zhou Yanyan as Ye's wife
 Huang Suiwen as Lao Zuo
 Li Xiang as Lao Hu
 Bu Wenhui as Lao Yue
 Huang Wei as Accountant Zhang
 Peng Dongxu as Zeng's father
 Zhao Qian as Zeng's mother
 Yu Yan as Teacher Tang
 Hu Chenxi as Yang Han

Production

Filming 
The Bad Kids was headed by the same team behind Burning Ice, which was adapted from another one of Zi Jinchen's works. In 2018, iQiyi, who owns the copyright of the original novel, contacted Wannian Pictures (whom they had previously cooperated with), in hopes of turning the novel into film and television. The people behind the scenes include photography director Li Jianing, art director Tian Zhuangzhuang, editing director Lu Di, and casting director Li Junting. Producer Lu Jing met up to 30 screenwriters for the project and settled for the final four. Pan was the first screenwriter and was responsible for the overall story and characters of the script, while Hu added the specific details. Sun Haoyang rewrote the original novel into a script outline that "retained the original author Zi Jinchen's most exciting characters and story bridges, and lay a good foundation for the entire adaptation." House of Cards screenwriter Joe Cacaci acted as script consultant.

The series was mainly shot in Zhanjiang in 75 days between June and September 2019.

Casting 
The crew revealed that it took six months to cast before the filming began and selected three child actors from more than 2,000 children.

When approached for the part without the script, Qin Hao initially declined the role, remarking, "I have read the novel. If I play a child, I will play it. If I play Zhang Dongsheng, the character's motive is just for money and it's flat. I don't think it's interesting." He also admitted the decision was influenced by the fact that he now avoided villain roles after having a daughter. However, after meeting with the director and producer Lu Jing, he was convinced to take up the role.

The role Chen Guansheng was not in the original novel, and was written specifically for Wang Jingchun, who the crew wanted but could not cast for Burning Ice.

Soundtrack 

Each of the series' 12 episodes features its own ending theme, with the last episode's theme composed and written by director, Xin Shuang. The Bad Kids Soundtrack Album (隐秘的角落 配乐专辑) was released on June 23, 2020, and features 35 total tracks. It also includes the 11th episode ending theme, "Past, No Glory (昔日，没有光彩)".

Reception 
The series released with critical acclaim, with Beijing Times noting: "Some people say that [The Bad Kids] raises the standard of domestic suspense dramas. From narrative, art, photography to performance, it has truly improved the standard." Director and actress Zhang Ziyi praised the series' production and the actors' performances, proclaiming: "After watching American and British dramas for so many years, there is finally a "Chinese drama" whose quality can compete with them."

The Bad Kids also became a social media hit. By June 23, the series garnered 1.12 billion topic posts on Weibo, and by the 25th, trended on the site 50+ times. After broadcast, a quote by Zhang Dongsheng, “Wanna go for a hike (一起爬山吗)?”, became a widely used meme and euphemism "for wishing to do someone harm". A phone case featuring the quote (meant to promote exercising and unaffiliated with the show) became a best-selling item on Taobao.

The show currently earns an 8.9 on Douban with more than 619,000 user reviews.

Variety listed The Bad Kids in second place as their "The 15 Best International Series of 2020", and  gained favorable reviews for its storytelling, cinematography, performances and dark soundtrack. This series also won several awards including the Best Creative at the Asia Content Awards unit of 25th Busan International Film Festival.

Awards and nominations

References

External links 

 The Bad Kids on Weibo
 The Bad Kids on Douban

2020 Chinese television series debuts
2020 Chinese television series endings
Chinese crime television series
Mandarin-language television shows
Chinese web series
IQIYI original programming
Television shows based on Chinese novels